Julio César Morales Araújo, nicknamed Cascarilla (16 February 1945 – 14 February 2022) was a Uruguayan professional footballer who played as a striker. He was part of the Uruguay squad for the 1970 World Cup, where they finished fourth, as well as in a Mundialito winning team in January 1981, at the age of almost 36. He won a number of trophies in South America and Europe including the Copa Libertadores in 1971 and 1980.

Club career
Morales started his career in 1961 at the age of 16 with Racing Club de Montevideo, in 1965 he was signed by Uruguayan giants Nacional he helped the club to win five league titles and a Copa Libertadores before moving to Europe to play for Austria Wien.

With Austria Wien he won two Austrian league titles and two Austrian Cups, he also played in the European Cup Winners Cup final in 1978.

After the disappointment of missing out on the Cup Winners Cup, Morales returned to Nacional, where he won another league title and Copa Libertadores before his retirement in 1982.

Morales is the fifth highest scoring player in the history of the Copa Libertadores with 30 goals, he scored a total of 191 goals for Nacional in 471 appearances.

Death 
Morales died in Montevideo on 14 February 2022, two days before his 77th birthday.

Honours
Nacional
Primera División  (6): 1966, 1969, 1970, 1971, 1972, 1980
Copa Libertadores: 1971, 1980
Copa Intercontinental:  1971, 1980
Copa Interamericana: 1971

Austria Wien
Austrian Bundesliga: 1975–76, 1977–78
Austrian Cup: 1973-74, 1976-77

References

External links
Nacional player profile 

1945 births
2022 deaths
1970 FIFA World Cup players
Footballers from Montevideo
Uruguayan footballers
Association football forwards
Copa Libertadores-winning players
Uruguay international footballers
Uruguayan Primera División players
Austrian Football Bundesliga players
Racing Club de Montevideo players
Club Nacional de Football players
FK Austria Wien players
Uruguayan expatriate footballers
Uruguayan expatriate sportspeople in Austria
Expatriate footballers in Austria